The Maring people, are a Tibeto-Burman ethnic group of Northeast Indian state of Manipur.

See also
Maring Naga language

References

Scheduled Tribes of Manipur
Ethnic groups in Northeast India
Ethnic groups in Manipur
People from Chandel district
Ethnic groups in South Asia